The Merry World of Léopold Z is a 1965 comedy-drama by Gilles Carle that played a key role in efforts to create a popular national cinema in Quebec.

The film follows the misadventures of its title character Léopold Z. (Guy L'Écuyer), a snow plow operator for the City of Montreal, on Christmas Eve. The filmincorporates documentary film footage of snow clearing in Montreal, and in fact, had been originally commissioned by the National Film Board of Canada as a documentary on snow clearing, only to be turned into a fictional film by the director. The film paints a portrait of a hapless Québécois little man, battling the winter elements as well as the demands of consumerism, sexual desire and the requirement at that time for French-speaking Quebecers to speak English to be successful.

As with other Quebec NFB films of the period, the film incorporates Direct Cinema techniques. It is also a film with a strong political point of view, with Carle intending his central character to be a "pre-revolutionary" figure, representing how the Québécois people were being exploited by a capitalist, English-speaking power structure.

Ironically, while the film portrays a plow operator battling a traditional Montreal snow storm, an almost snowless winter meant that Carle had to film sporadically over 18 months. The film would go on to win first prize in the feature films category at the Festival of Canadian Films, held as part of the 1965 Montreal International Film Festival.

References

External links
Watch La vie heureuse de Léopold Z, National Film Board of Canada website (in French)

Films directed by Gilles Carle
1965 films
Films set in Montreal
Films shot in Montreal
National Film Board of Canada films
1960s Christmas comedy-drama films
1960s Christmas films
Canadian Christmas comedy-drama films
Canadian black-and-white films
Films produced by Jacques Bobet
1965 comedy films
1965 drama films
French-language Canadian films
1960s Canadian films